The House of Solomon can refer to

 The Solomonic dynasty, the traditional Imperial House of Ethiopia
 Salomon's House in the 1627 utopian work New Atlantis by Francis Bacon